Odysseas Elytis (pen name of Odysseas Alepoudellis, ; 2 November 1911 – 18 March 1996) was a Greek poet, man of letters, essayist and translator, regarded as the definitive exponent of romantic modernism in Greece and the world. He is one of the most praised poets of the second half of the twentieth century, with his Axion Esti "regarded as a monument of contemporary poetry". In 1979, he was awarded the Nobel Prize in Literature.

Biography

Descendants of the Alepoudelis, whose name going back was Alepos and even further back connected to the revolutionary Lemonis in Lesbos, Panayiotis Alepoudelis and his younger brother Thrasyboulos, both born in the village Kalamiaris of Panagiouthas of Lesbos, established the industries of their soap manufacturing and olive oil production in Heraklion, Crete in 1895. In 1897 Panagyiotis married Maria E Vrana 1880-1960 from the village Papados of Geras, Lesbos. From this union and as the last of six siblings Odysseas was born in the early hours of 2 November 1911. He is pictured on the far left wearing a sailor's uniform in the photo of his family. The Alepoudelis later moved to Athens, where his father re-situated the soap factory in Piraeus. In 1918 his older sister and first born Myrsene (1898-1918) died in the Spanish influenza. While on summer holidays from their Athens home as guests on the island of Spetses in the Haramis home in the St Nicolaos neighbourhood his own father also died in the summer of 1925 from pneumonia. In 1927 wrought with overtiredness Odysseas was diagnosed with tuberculosis. While in bed recuperating he voraciously read all the Greek poetry he could and in this year discovered Cavafy. In 1928 he graduated from high school and successfully passed the difficult entrance exams to law school at University of Athens. He read in the newspapers of the suicide of the poet Karyiotakis. In 1929 Elytis took a sabbatical between high school and university and decided secretly that he must only become a poet. In 1930 he and his family moved to Moshoniseon 148. Elytis had initial aspirations to become a lawyer but did not sit for his final examinations and did not get his legal qualification. He also had expressed aspirations to become a painter in the manner of the surrealists but his family quickly thwarted this idea.

In 1935 Elytis published his first poem in the journal New Letters (Νέα Γράμματα) at the prompting of such friends as George Seferis. In the same year he also became a lifelong friend of writer and psychoanalyst Andreas Embiricos, who allowed him to have access to his vast library of books. In 1977 two years after the death of his friend Elytis wrote a tribute book to Embiricos from within the commonalities that founded their ideas aptly titled "Reference to Andreas Embiricos" and originally published by Tram publishers Thessaloniki. His entry to the magazine "New Letters" in 1935 was in November which was the 11th issue and with his pseudonym Elytis established therein. With a distinctively earthy and original form in his expression Elytis assisted inaugurating a new era in Greek poetry and its subsequent reform after the Second World War. In 1960 his older brother Constantine [1905-1960] died, followed by his mother Maria Vrana Alepoudelis. Elytis was simultaneously awarded the First National Prize for poetry for his  work "Axion Esti". In 1967 Elytis travelled to Egypt, visiting Alexandria, Cairo, Luxor and Aswan. Returning to Greece in March he finished his piecing together of the fragments of Sappho's verses translated into modern Greek and brought them together with his own diaphanous iconography. These were published finally in 1984 without the drawings which are deposited separately in the archives of the American School of Classical Studies along with the original manuscripts of the initial translations of Sappho. With the April 21st military dictatorship in force Elytis disappeared from public view.

From 1969 to 1972, under the Greek military junta of 1967–1974, Elytis exiled himself to Paris after he refused money from the junta and established a modest residence there. In Paris he lived with the English philologist, lyricist and musicologist Marianina Kriezi [1947-2022], who subsequently produced and hosted the legendary children's radio broadcast "Here Lilliput Land". Kriezi was extraordinary, having published a book of poems at the age of fourteen. There is speculation that Kriezi and Elytis were secretly married in Paris but with their return to Greece their French marriage was invalidated and they separated, never divorcing. When Elytis died, however, he was buried wearing the silver wedding band that had the name "Marianina" engraved inside it. The silver ring is on the cover of "Analogies of Light" within a picture that shows only the author's hands writing inside a book. Ivar Ivask also noted the presence of the photo of Kriezi [a muse inside a silver frame across from the photo of his mother] in the home of Elytis when editing the aforementioned book. On the day he died three photographs of women that he had loved and influenced him were in his small apartment. In his bedroom the black and white photo of his mother was by his left bedside table and the photo of Kriezi taken in Paris on the table facing that. In the living room on the top of a dresser drawer was the photo of Anita Mozas who had a yellow carnation and a red rose flower adorning her chignon in a semi profile colour picture.The CBC in January 1980{Canadian Broadcasting Corporation} Radio had sent her to Greece to obtain an interview from Elytis and that is how they eventually met and became friends.Previously in 1973 when Anita Mozas had traveled to Greece to attend a private school she had made the acquaintance of the poet by way of her mother's interest in randomly choosing one of his apartments for rent on Ypsilantou street in Athens near the Canadian Embassy.The apartment was not furnished so her mother did not rent it.Notably she was one of his platonic friends who comprehended him at a literary level better than others.

The war
In 1937 he served his military requirements. As an army cadet, he joined the National Military School in Corfu. He assisted Frederica of Hanover off the train and on to Greek soil personally when she arrived from Germany to marry hereditary Prince Paul. During the war he was appointed Second Lieutenant, placed initially at the 1st Army Corps Headquarters, then transferred to the 24th Regiment, on the first-line of the battlefields.in 1941  he contracts an acute case of typhus abdominalis and is transferred to the Ioanina Hospital into the pathology unit for officers.Elytis comes very close to his death here and given options to stay at this hospital and be a prisoner when the Germans fully enter and occupy or be transferred with the risk of intestinal perforation and hemorrhage. On the eve of the invasion of the German armies he decides to be transferred to Aigrinio and from there eventually back to Athens where he makes a slow but steady recovery during the German occupation.He begins to outline poetry for his eventual work "Sun THe First" and in Alexandria Seferis delivers a lecture on Elytis and Antoniou.  Elytis was sporadically publishing poetry and essays after his initial foray into the literary world.

He was a member of the Association of Greek Art Critics, AICA-Hellas, International Association of Art Critics.

Programme director for ERT
He was twice Programme Director of the Greek National Radio Foundation (1945–46 and 1953–54), Member of the Greek National Theatre's Administrative Council, President of the Administrative Council of the Greek Radio and Television as well as Member of the Consultative Committee of the Greek National Tourists' Organisation on the Athens Festival. In 1960 he was awarded the First State Poetry Prize, in 1965 the Order of the Phoenix and in 1975 he was awarded the Doctor Honoris Causa in the Faculty of Philosophy at Thessaloniki University and received the Honorary Citizenship of the Town of Mytilene.

Travels
In 1948–1952 and 1969–1972 he lived in Paris. There, he audited philology and literature seminars at the Sorbonne and was well received by the pioneers of the world's avant-garde (Reverdy, Breton, Tzara, Ungaretti, Matisse, Picasso, Francoise Gilot, Chagall, Giacometti) as Tériade's most respected friend. Teriade was simultaneously in Paris publishing works with all the renowned artists and philosophers (Kostas Axelos, Jean-Paul Sartre, Francoise Gilot, René Daumal) of the time. Elytis and Teriade had formed a strong friendship that solidified in 1939 with the publication of Elytis first book of poetry entitled "Orientations". Both Elytis and Teriade hailed from Lesbos and had a mutual love of the Greek painter Theophilos. Starting from Paris he travelled and subsequently visited Switzerland, England, Italy and Spain. In 1948 he was the representative of Greece at the International Meetings of Geneva, in 1949 at the Founding Congress of the International Art Critics Union in Paris and in 1962 at the Incontro Romano della Cultura in Rome.

In 1961, upon an invitation of the State Department, he traveled through the USA from  March to June to New York Washington New Orleans Santa Fe Los Angeles San Francisco Boston Buffalo Chicago His return was to Paris to meet up with Teriade and then to Greece — Upon similar invitations in 1962 with Andreas Embiricos and Yiorgos Theotokas [1905-1966] through the Soviet Union to Odessa Moscow and Leningrad. Elytis did not like Yevgeny Yevtushenko when they were introduced but appreciated Voznesensky That summer he spent part of his holidays on Corfu Island and the rest on Lesbos where he and Teriade[who had returned from Paris] were establishing the foundations of a museum dedicated to the painter Theophilos. In 1964 the  inaugural performance of the oratorio to the poetry of the Axion Esti as set to music by MIkis Theodorakis was held. In 1965 he completes the essays that will  be comprised as the book "The Open Papers" and in that summer visits the Greek islands yet again. He visited Bulgaria in 1965.with his friend Yiorgos Theotokas [their final journey together] as invited by the Union of Bulgarian Authors and their guide throughout this country was the poetess Elisaveta Bagryana[1893-1991] who had been nominated three times until then for the Nobel prize in Literature. In 1965 he is also bestowed with the highest honour of the Greek nation the Phoenix Cross

Death
Odysseas Elytis had been completing plans to travel overseas to see friends when he died of a heart failure in Athens on 18 March 1996, at the age of 84.He had  made it known that he was a believer in cremation and had wished that somehow he could have been cremated which the tenets of his Greek Orthodox religion do not support or allow.He was also a supporter of the legalization of euthanasia for people who wished to die after pain and suffering.And he believed it was a woman's right to choose abortion in any circumstance.
In the last eight years of his life he lived with a companion, Ioulita Iliopoulou [nee Sofia Iliopoulou, daughter of Dimitrios and Demetra July 1, 1965] who was 53 years his junior. Iliopoulou is an activist for children throughout the world imparting her knowledge whenever she is able to. She is a successful artist in her own right translating and composing her own works and giving poetry recitals whenever possible. Iliopoulou is gifted and acclaimed also as fine librettist. She has successfully taken the works of ELytis into a wider audience and broader spectrum 
Iliopoulou inherited his immovable property in real estate which consisted of four apartments and the trustee power of copyrights to his work. She has been capably promoting Elytis and his legacy Elytis was survived in his bloodline by his niece Myrsene [from his oldest brother Theodoros born 1900 { and his next in line older brother Evangelos. This brother [born 1909-2002} also received a writ of condolence from the mayor of Athens on behalf of the nation at the funeral at the First Cemetery of Athens

Poetry

Elytis' poetry has marked, through an active presence of over forty years, a broad spectrum of subject matter and stylistic touch with an emphasis on the expression of that which is rarefied and passionate. He borrowed certain elements from Ancient Greece and Byzantium but devoted himself exclusively to today's Hellenism, of which he attempted—in a certain way based on psychical and sentimental aspects—to reconstruct a modernist mythology for the institutions. His main endeavour was to rid people's conscience from unjustifiable remorses and to complement natural elements through ethical powers, to achieve the highest possible transparency in expression and finally, to succeed in approaching the mystery of light, the metaphysics of the sun of which he was a "worshiper" -idolater by his own definition. A parallel manner concerning technique resulted in introducing the inner architecture, which is evident in a great many poems of his; mainly in the phenomenal landmark work It Is Truly Meet (Το Άξιον Εστί). This work due to its setting to music by Mikis Theodorakis  as an oratorio, is a revered anthem whose verse is sung by all Greeks for all injustice, resistance and for its sheer beauty and musicality of form. Elytis' theoretical and philosophical ideas have been expressed in a series of essays under the title The Open Papers (Ανοιχτά Χαρτιά). Besides creating poetry he applied himself to translating poetry and theatre as well as a series of collage pictures. Translations of his poetry have been published as autonomous books, in anthologies or in periodicals in eleven languages.

Works

Poetry
 Orientations (Προσανατολισμοί, 1939)
 Sun The First Together With Variations on A Sunbeam (Ηλιος ο πρώτος, παραλλαγές πάνω σε μιαν αχτίδα, 1943)
 An Heroic And Funeral Chant For The Lieutenant Lost In Albania (Άσμα ηρωικό και πένθιμο για τον χαμένο ανθυπολοχαγό της Αλβανίας, 1962)
 To Axion Esti—It Is Worthy (Το Άξιον Εστί, 1959)
 Six Plus One Remorses For The Sky (Έξη και μια τύψεις για τον ουρανό, 1960)
 The Light Tree And The Fourteenth Beauty (Το φωτόδεντρο και η δέκατη τέταρτη ομορφιά, 1972)
 The Sovereign Sun (Ο ήλιος ο ηλιάτορας, 1971)
 The Trills of Love (Τα Ρω του Έρωτα, 1973)
 Villa Natacha {published in Thessaloniki by Tram and dedicated to E Terade 1973]
 The Monogram (Το Μονόγραμμα, 1972)
 Step-Poems (Τα Ετεροθαλή, 1974)
 Signalbook (Σηματολόγιον, 1977)
 Maria Nefeli (Μαρία Νεφέλη, 1978)
 Three Poems under a Flag of Convenience (Τρία ποιήματα με σημαία ευκαιρίας 1982)
 Diary of an Invisible April (Ημερολόγιο ενός αθέατου Απριλίου, 1984)* Krinagoras (Κριναγόρας, 1987)
 The Little Mariner (Ο Μικρός Ναυτίλος, 1988)
 The Elegies of Oxopetra (Τα Ελεγεία της Οξώπετρας, 1991)
 West of Sadness (Δυτικά της λύπης, 1995)
 Eros, Eros, Eros: Selected and Last Poems (Copper Canyon Press, 1998) (translated by Olga Broumas)

Prose, essays
 The True Face and Lyrical Bravery of Andreas Kalvos (Η Αληθινή φυσιογνωμία και η λυρική τόλμη του Ανδρέα Κάλβου, 1942)
 2x7 e (collection of small essays) (2χ7 ε (συλλογή μικρών δοκιμίων))
 (Offering) My Cards To Sight (Ανοιχτά χαρτιά (συλλογή κειμένων), 1973)
 The Painter Theophilos (Ο ζωγράφος Θεόφιλος, 1973)
 The Magic Of Papadiamantis (Η μαγεία του Παπαδιαμάντη, 1975)
 Reference to Andreas Embeirikos (Αναφορά στον Ανδρέα Εμπειρίκο, 1977)
 Things Public and Private (Τα Δημόσια και τα Ιδιωτικά, 1990)
 Private Way (Ιδιωτική Οδός, 1990)
 Carte Blanche («Εν λευκώ» (συλλογή κειμένων), 1992)
 The Garden with the Illusions (Ο κήπος με τις αυταπάτες, 1995)
 Open Papers: Selected Essays (Copper Canyon Press, 1995) (translated by Olga Broumas and T. Begley)

Art books
 The Room with the Pictures (Το δωμάτιο με τις εικόνες, 1986) – collages by Odysseas Elytis, text by Evgenios Aranitsis

Translations
 Second Writing (Δεύτερη γραφή, 1976)
 Sappho (Σαπφώ)
 The Apocalypse (by John) (Η αποκάλυψη, 1985)

Translations of Elytis' work
 Poesie. Procedute dal Canto eroico e funebre per il sottotenente caduto in Albania. Trad. Mario Vitti (Roma. Il Presente. 1952)
 21 Poesie. Trad. Vicenzo Rotolo (Palermo. Istituto Siciliano di Studi Bizantini e Neoellenici. 1968)
 Poèmes. Trad. Robert Levesque (1945)
 Six plus un remords pourle ciel. Trad. F. B. Mache (Fata Morgana. Montpellier 1977)
 Körper des Sommers. Übers. Barbara Schlörb (St. Gallen 1960)
 Sieben nächtliche Siebenzeiler. Übers. Günter Dietz (Darmstadt 1966)
 To Axion Esti – Gepriesen sei. Übers. Günter Dietz (Hamburg 1969)
 The Axion Esti. Tr. E. Keeley and G. Savidis (Pittsburgh 1974 – Greek & English)(repr. London: Anvil Press, 1980 – English only)
 Lofwaardig is. Vert. Guido Demoen (Ghent 1989–1991)
 The Sovereign Sun: selected poems. Tr. K. Friar (1974; repr. 1990)
 Selected poems. Ed. E. Keeley and Ph. Sherrard (1981; repr. 1982, 1991)
 Maria Nephele, tr. A. Anagnostopoulos (1981)
 Çılgın Nar Ağacı, tr. C. Çapan (Istanbul: Adam Yayınları, 1983)
 What I love: selected poems, tr. O. Broumas (1986) [Greek & English texts]
 To Àxion Estí, tr. Rubén J. Montañés (Valencia: Alfons el Magnànim, 1992) [Catalan & Greek edition with notes]
 The Collected Poems of Odysseus Elytis, Tr. Jeffrey Carson & Nikos Sarris (The Johns Hopkins University Press, 1997, 2004)
 The Oxopetra Elegies and West of Sorrow , Tr. David Connolly (Harvard University Press - 2014) (Greek & English texts)

Notes

References
From Nobel Lectures, Literature 1968–1980, Editor-in-Charge: Tore Frängsmyr, Editor: Sture Allén, World Scientific Publishing Co., Singapore, 1993.

Further reading
 Mario Vitti: Odysseus Elytis. Literature 1935–1971 (Icaros 1977)
 Tasos Lignadis: Elytis' Axion Esti (1972)
 Lili Zografos: Elytis – The Sun Drinker (1972); as well as the special issue of the American magazine Books Abroad dedicated to the work of Elytis (Autumn 1975. Norman, Oklahoma, U.S.A.)
 Odysseas Elytis: Analogies of Light. Ed. I. Ivask (1981)
 A. Decavalles: Maria Nefeli and the Changeful Sameness of Elytis' Variations on a theme (1982)
 E. Keeley: Elytis and the Greek Tradition (1983)
 Ph. Sherrard: 'Odysseus Elytis and the Discovery of Greece', in Journal of Modern Greek Studies, 1(2), 1983
 K. Malkoff: 'Eliot and Elytis: Poet of Time, Poet of Space', in Comparative Literature, 36(3), 1984
 A. Decavalles: 'Odysseus Elytis in the 1980s', in World Literature Today, 62(l), 1988
 I. Loulakaki-Moore: Seferis and Elytis as Translators. (Oxford: Peter Lang, 2010)

External links

 
 Biography in the site of Greek National Book Centre 
 Recitations of poems by Elytis
 Parts of works of his
 Books in Greek about Elytis 

1911 births
1996 deaths
People from Mytilene
Writers from Heraklion
National and Kapodistrian University of Athens alumni
Cretan poets
Modern Greek poets
Generation of the '30s
Nobel laureates in Literature
Greek Nobel laureates
Greek art critics
Recipients of the Order of the Phoenix (Greece)
Burials at the First Cemetery of Athens
20th-century Greek poets
Greek military personnel of World War II